Butler is a small village in Montgomery County, Illinois, United States. The population was 180 at the 2010 census.

Geography

Demographics

As of the census of 2000, there were 197 people, 77 households, and 50 families residing in the village. The racial makeup of the village was 99.49% White and 0.51% African American.

There were 77 households, out of which 29.9% had children under the age of 18 living with them, 53.2% were married couples living together, 9.1% had a female householder with no husband present, and 33.8% were non-families. 31.2% of all households were made up of individuals, and 18.2% had someone living alone who was 65 years of age or older. The average household size was 2.56 and the average family size was 3.20.

In the village, the population was spread out, with 28.4% under the age of 18, 6.1% from 18 to 24, 29.9% from 25 to 44, 18.8% from 45 to 64, and 16.8% who were 65 years of age or older. The median age was 35 years. For every 100 females, there were 87.6 males. For every 100 females age 18 and over, there were 85.5 males.

The median income for a household in the village was $31,364, and the median income for a family was $32,500. Males had a median income of $27,500 versus $15,417 for females. The per capita income for the village was $11,081. About 17.2% of families and 17.5% of the population were below the poverty line, including 5.8% of those under the age of 18 and 27.1% of those 65 or over.

Protected areas
Butler is the northwestern end of the Arches Rail Trail, a three-mile trail that serves a portion of Montgomery County and connects Butler with nearby Hillsboro.

References

External links
 Butler Illinois Historical Society of Montgomery County Illinois

Villages in Montgomery County, Illinois
Villages in Illinois